Hayato Station is the name of two train stations in Japan:

 Hayato Station (Fukushima) (早戸駅)
 Hayato Station (Kagoshima) (隼人駅)